Tanel Toom (born 1 November 1982) is an Estonian director and screenwriter.

Toom studied filmmaking at Tallinn University, graduating with a BA in 2005. After that, he worked as a director for commercials and as a first assistant director. In 2008, he completed his fourth short film, The Second Coming, which premiered at the Venice Film Festival. The apocalyptical war drama has since been screened at numerous film festivals and won several awards, including Best European Short at the Arcipelago International Film Festival. The same year, he decided to continue his studies at the National Film and Television School in England. He graduated from the NFTS with an MA in 2010 and shortly after that his diploma film The Confession  won the Student Academy Award for Honorary Foreign Film and got him an Academy Award nomination for Live Action Short Film.

Filmography

Film

References

External links

 List of movies at united agents
www.taneltoom.com

1982 births
Living people
Estonian film directors
Alumni of the National Film and Television School
Tallinn University alumni
Student Academy Award winners
People from Tallinn
Tallinn French School alumni